Kilcreene Orthopaedic Hospital is a public hospital located at Kilcreene in County Kilkenny, Ireland. It is managed by South/Southwest Hospital Group.

History
The site occupied by the hospital was originally part of the Kilcreene House Estate, the home of the Evans baronets. After the house had been demolished, a modern medical facility was built and opened as Lourdes Orthopaedic Hospital in 1959. In March 2019 the Health Service Executive announced that it would transfer orthopaedic services from the hospital, by then known as Kilcreene Orthopaedic Hospital, to the University Hospital Waterford.

Services
The hospital provides 50 in-patient beds.

See also
 St. Dympna's Hospital
 St. Luke's General Hospital

References

Hospitals in County Kilkenny
Health Service Executive hospitals
Hospital buildings completed in 1959
Hospitals established in 1959
1959 establishments in Ireland